The Medium ( Rang Song, literally: Mediumship) is a 2021 Thai-South Korean mockumentary supernatural horror film co-written and produced by Na Hong-jin and directed by Banjong Pisanthanakun. It is a co-production of Thailand's GDH 559 and South Korea's Showbox. The film was premiered at the 25th Bucheon International Fantastic Film Festival on 11 July 2021. It was theatrically released in South Korea on 14 July 2021. It was selected as the Thai entry for the Best International Feature Film at the 94th Academy Awards but was not nominated.

The film was judged the best feature film at 25th Bucheon International Fantastic Film Festival and was awarded with the Bucheon Choice Award for the best film. On the box office front as per Korean Film Council data, it is ranked 15th among all the films released in the year 2021 in South Korea, with gross of US$7.35 million and 831,126 admissions, as of 26 September 2021. It is the 6th highest-grossing Korean film of 2021.

Plot
A documentary crew travels to the Isan region of Thailand to interview Nim, a medium/shaman who claims to be possessed by the spirit of Ba Yan, a local goddess. She had been chosen to be Ba Yan's host after her sister, Noi, refused to accept the role and converted to Christianity.

Nim attends the funeral of Noi's husband, Wiroj, who died of a heart attack, and reveals that misfortune had befallen the men in his family. Wiroj's father killed himself after he was caught committing insurance fraud. Wiroj's son, Mac, died in a traffic accident. Noi is left with her daughter, Mink, and they live with Manit (Nim and Noi's brother) and his family.

Mink starts behaving strangely and exhibiting multiple personalities, including those of an attention-seeking child, an old man, a drunkard, and a prostitute. She also hears voices in her head, has nightmares, and experiences abdominal pain and vaginal bleeding. She is fired from her job after her boss discovers that she has been having sex with different men at her workplace. Nim initially believes that Ba Yan has selected Mink to be the next host but Noi refuses a ceremony to transfer the spirit from Nim to Mink. Nim learns that Mink had committed incest with Mac, who had actually hanged himself, and thinks that Mac's ghost is haunting Mink. After Mink attempts suicide, Noi thinks Ba Yan is punishing Mink for refusing to be her host so she arranges for a shaman to conduct the transference ceremony without telling Nim. The ceremony fails and a possessed Mink attacks her mother before running away. Meanwhile, on the way to the shrine, Nim sees that Ba Yan's statue has been decapitated.

A month later, Mink is found in a delirious state in the ruins of her grandfather's factory. Nim brings Mink to see a more powerful shaman, Santi, who says Mink has been possessed by numerous evil spirits. Mink's ancestors had been cursed for committing wicked deeds, hence the misfortunes that befell her family. The failed transference ceremony worsened Mink's condition by making her more vulnerable to possession by any spirit. Nim, along with Santi and his students, prepares for an elaborate ritual to exorcise Mink. In the days leading to the ritual, Mink creates havoc at home by briefly abducting Manit's son, boiling her family's dog alive and eating it, among other things, while Nim dies in her sleep the day before the ritual.

During the ritual, Noi volunteers her body as a vessel to attract all the evil spirits haunting Mink, so that Santi can trap them in a container and bury it deep in the ground. Meanwhile, the possessed Mink has been locked in her room and the door sealed with paper charms; Manit's wife and others keep watch  to ensure she does not come out until the ritual is complete. Halfway into the ritual, Manit's wife hears her son's crying coming from Mink's room and thinks that Mink has kidnapped her son again. She enters the room, only to be stabbed to death by Mink. All hell breaks loose when the evil spirits possess everyone involved in the ritual, making them fight and kill themselves or each other.

In the meantime, Mink kills everyone at home and goes to the factory, where she meets her mother and a few survivors. Noi is possessed by Ba Yan's spirit for a moment when she chants a prayer while touching her daughter's head, attempting to exorcise her. However, she is distracted when Mink apparently returns to normal and calls her "Mother". Mink uses the chance to burn her mother alive, while the survivors are eventually overwhelmed by the possessed.

A mid-credits scene shows Nim undergoing a crisis of faith one day before her death. She wonders if she has really been possessed by Ba Yan before breaking down in tears.

Cast
 Narilya Gulmongkolpech as Mink
 Sawanee Utoomma as Nim
 Sirani Yankittikan as Noi
 Yasaka Chaisorn as Manit
 Boonsong Nakphoo as Santi

Production
The film was shot in the Loei province in northeast Thailand (Isan).

The film was announced in February 2021, and was scheduled for a July 2021 release in South Korea.

Release
The Medium is sold by Finecut for the upcoming European Film Market and the film's rights had been already acquired by The Jokers for future theatrical release in France, and by Koch Films to German-speaking territories. As of September, Shudder had acquired the overall streaming rights and it will stream in the US on October 14.

In Asia, the film has been licensed to Edko Films for Macau and Hong Kong (22 September 2021), MovieCloud for Taiwan (25 August 2021), Synca Creations for Japan (29 July 2022), to Encore Films for Malaysia (2 December 2021) and Indonesia (20 October 2021), Golden Village for Singapore (12 August 2021), M Pictures for Cambodia (26 November 2021) and Laos (6 January 2022) and Lumix Media for Vietnam (19 November 2021).

The film was premiered on July 11, 2021, at the 25th Bucheon International Fantastic Film Festival, and it was released theatrically in South Korea on July 14, 2021.

Home media
The film was made available for streaming and broadcasting in South Korea on IPTV, Skylife, HomeChoice cable TV, KT Seezn and others from September 16, 2021.

Reception

Box office
The film was released on 14 July 2021, on 1403 screens. According to the integrated computer network for movie theater admissions by the Korea Film Council (KoFiC), the film ranked at first place at the Korean box office on opening day by collecting 129,917 audiences, surpassing the audiences of Black Widow. On the 4th day of release it became the highest-grossing film in the horror genre by surpassing US$2.67 million gross. The cumulative audience of the film stands at 403,019 as on 17 July 2021.

According to Korean Film Council (KOFIC) data, it is at 6th place among all the Korean films released in the year 2021, with gross of 	US$7.32 million and 831,126 admissions, as of 26 September 2021.

Critical response
The review aggregator Rotten Tomatoes reported that 77% of critics have given the film a positive review based on 22 reviews, with an average rating of 6.60/10.

Jo Yeon-kyung of JTBC Entertainment News rated the film with 4 out of 5 stars and wrote that the film has a dense narrative, and the sequences of worship and scenes of exorcism are combined with Thailand's unique culture to generate newness. Describing the scary parts of the film, Yeon-kyung wrote, "The scariest thing is that the closer you get to the ending, the more you are getting used to the huge scene unfolding before your eyes. Of course, the level of understanding and impact may vary depending on the individual audience."

Seo Jeong-won writing for Maeil Business praised the performance of Narilya Gunmong Konket and opined, "I am so immersed in acting that I have to worry about the trauma that can occur." Warning the audience about some portions of the film which showed cannibalism, animal cruelty, self-harm, and incest, Jeong-won wrote that they be careful as they might find it cruel. But in Jeong-won's opinion those were essential to narrative.

Kong Rithdee gave the film a positive review in the Bangkok Post, praising its use of Thai folklore with the visual and narrative resemblance to South Korea thrillers.

Choi Young-joo of CBS No Cut News wrote that the film directed in the form of found footage, has documentary character. Writing about the shamanic beliefs of the Isan region that not only humans but also everything in nature has a soul. Any action committed by ancestors became a curse and was passed down to the posterity, in context of the film it is the character Ming. Young-joo with respect to that belief wrote, "The Medium is a movie that makes you experience with your whole body that there are horror movies because there are human beings." Young-joo pointing out that in the film all the evils that humans can commit were in some way described, and albeit it was shown to portray human evil, but it did come to mind as to how far and how it would be shown.

Variety praised the film's musical score, production design, and its references to Thai culture, but criticised its length and the mockumentary format.

Accolades

See also
 List of submissions to the 94th Academy Awards for Best International Feature Film
 List of Thai submissions for the Academy Award for Best International Feature Film
 Satsana Phi
 Thai folklore
 Thai horror

References

External links
 
 
 

2021 films
2021 horror films
2020s mockumentary films
2020s supernatural horror films
South Korean supernatural horror films
Thai-language films
Thai supernatural films
Thai horror films
Films set in Thailand
Films shot in Thailand
GDH 559 films
Showbox films
Films about exorcism
Religious horror films
Films about cults
Folk horror films